Vocally Pimpin' is the debut extended play by American hip hop group Above the Law. It was released on July 16, 1991 via Ruthless Records. The first five songs on this nine track record are newly recorded material, while the rest four are remixes or edited versions of their previously released material. The album peaked at number 120 on the US Billboard 200 and number 37 on the Top R&B/Hip-Hop Albums charts.

Track listing

Sample credits
 "Playlude" contains elements of "Right On For The Darkness" by Curtis Mayfield (1973)
 "Playin' Your Game" contains elements of "Let Me Love You" by Michael Henderson (1977), "The Sponge" by Bob James & Earl Klugh (1992), "Playing Your Game, Baby" by Barry White (1977), "Back to Life (Acapella)" by Soul II Soul (1989)
 "Dose Of The Mega Flex" contains elements of "Genius of Love" by Tom Tom Club (1981)
 "4 The Funk Of It" contains elements of "One Nation Under A Groove" by Funkadelic (1978) and "Atomic Dog" by George Clinton (1982)
 "Wicked" contains elements of "Ode to Billie Joe" by Lou Donaldson (1967) and "Do The Funky Penguin (Part 2)" by Rufus Thomas (1971)
 "Livin' Like Hustlers (G-Mixx)" contains elements of "The Big Beat" by Billy Squier (1980) and "Johnny The Fox Meets Jimmy The Weed" by Thin Lizzy (1976)
 "B.M.L. (Commercial)" contains elements of "Funky Worm" by Ohio Players (1972)

Personnel 
adapted from Discogs

 Gregory Fernan Hutchinson – producer, mixing, keyboards
 Kevin Michael Gulley – co-producer
 Arthur Lee Goodman III – co-producer
 Larry Goodman – co-producer
 Anthony Stewart – co-producer
 Eric Wright – executive producer
 Stan "The Guitar" Man – bass, guitar
 B-Laid Back Edwards – keyboards
 Jerry Long Jr. – guest vocals (track 5)
 David Dyson – backing vocals
 Mark Paladino – engineer

Chart positions
Billboard Music Charts album
Billboard 200 (#120)
Top R&B/Hip-Hop Albums (#37)

Billboard Music Charts singles
"4 The Funk of It" (Hot Rap Singles) (#21)

References

1991 EPs
G-funk EPs
Gangsta rap EPs
Ruthless Records EPs
Albums produced by Laylaw
Above the Law (group) albums
Albums produced by Cold 187um